Beatriz Recari Eransus (born 21 April 1987) is a Spanish professional golfer on the U.S.-based LPGA Tour and the Ladies European Tour.

Amateur career
Born and raised in Pamplona in northern Spain, Recari began playing golf at age 11 and enjoyed a successful amateur career, with wins at the 2004 Spanish Amateur Championship and the 2005 French Amateur Championship. In 2003, she finished runner-up at the Girls Amateur Championship. She won the European Lady Junior's Team Championship as a member of Team Spain in 2004 and was a member of Team Europe in the 2005 Junior Solheim Cup.

Professional career
While studying economics at the University of Navarra in Pamplona, Recari qualified for the Ladies European Tour in November 2005 and turned professional at age 18 for the 2006 LET season. She balanced professional golf with school in the spring of 2006, but after the completion of her first academic year, she concentrated on her golf career.

2009
Her best season to date as a professional, she finished 22nd on the 2009 LET Order of Merit (money list), with earnings of €68,889.

At the LPGA Final Qualifying Tournament at Daytona Beach, Florida in December 2009, Recari finished tenth to earn her LPGA Tour card for the 2010 season. She ended 2009 ranked 175th in the Women's World Golf Rankings.

2010
During her first year on the LPGA Tour, Recari had made only three of thirteen cuts through September, and had missed the last five cuts.  With under $43,000 in earnings, a return to the Qualifying Tournament appeared imminent, but a successful autumn run allowed her to finish with over $265,000, 39th on the money list. Recari won her first LPGA event in October at the CVS/pharmacy LPGA Challenge in northern California and made the cut in her final five events to finish runner-up to compatriot Azahara Muñoz for 2010 LPGA Rookie of the Year honors. Recari ended the year at 56th in the world rankings.

2011
Starting in all 23 events of the year with a best finish of tied for eleventh at the ShopRite LPGA Classic, Recari earned $223,053, which put her No. 43 on the money list. Recari ended the year ranked 72nd in the world rankings.

2012
Recari played and made the cut in all of the 27 LPGA official events in 2012. Her streak of consecutive starts and cuts made earned her the nickname "Iron Woman". Recari earned $444,620 with five top-ten finishes, which ranked her 32nd on the money list. Her best finish throughout the year was a tied for sixth at the Navistar LPGA Classic. Recari ended 2012 ranked 59th in the world rankings.

Personal life
Recari struggled with eating disorder in her early professional years. She went public with her struggle at the 2011 RR Donnelley LPGA Founders Cup when she donated her winnings to The Alliance for Eating Disorders Awareness. She was subsequently named the "Ambassador" of The Alliance for Eating Disorders Awareness in 2013.

Recari began dating Andreas Thorp, her caddie, in 2008. Their relationship ended in 2018.

Professional wins (4)

LPGA Tour wins (3)

LPGA Tour playoff record (1–0)

Ladies European Tour wins (1)

1Holed out from the fairway for eagle on the first extra hole.

Results in LPGA majors
Results not in chronological order before 2019.

^ The Evian Championship was added as a major in 2013

CUT = missed the half-way cut
WD = withdrew
"T" = tied

Summary

Most consecutive cuts made – 6 (2012 Kraft Nabisco – 2013 LPGA)
Longest streak of top-10s – 1

LPGA Tour career summary

 official through 2020 season

LET career summary

Source:

World ranking
Position in Women's World Golf Rankings at the end of each calendar year.

Team appearances
Amateur
European Lady Junior's Team Championship (representing Spain): 2004 (winners)
Espirito Santo Trophy (representing Spain): 2004
Junior Solheim Cup (representing Europe): 2005

Professional
Solheim Cup (representing Europe): 2013 (winners)
International Crown (representing Spain): 2014 (winners)

Solheim Cup record

References

External links
 – 

Spanish female golfers
Ladies European Tour golfers
LPGA Tour golfers
Solheim Cup competitors for Europe
University of Navarra alumni
Sportspeople from Pamplona
1987 births
Living people
20th-century Spanish women
21st-century Spanish women